Destroy Erase Improve is the second studio album by Swedish extreme metal band Meshuggah. It was released on 12 May 1995 by Nuclear Blast. This is the first studio album to feature rhythm guitarist Mårten Hagström and the final to feature bassist Peter Nordin, as he left the band during the supporting tour due to vertigo.

Legacy
Describing the record as "one of the 90's definitive metallic works", Kevin Stewart-Panko argues that Destroy Erase Improve's unique fusion of genres amounted to a new "watermark" for heavy metal upon its release. Metal critic Martin Popoff regards Destroy Erase Improve as the first clear demonstration of what would become the quintessential Meshuggah sound, wherein "stutter gun" riffs and "upset apple cart time signatures" are featured alongside "bone-breaking" percussion, an approach which resulted in considerable influence in the development of genres like mathcore and djent. Popoff suggests that Destroy Erase Improve is the clear linchpin of Meshuggah's particular style, a "specific, nearly absurd proposal that only this band has dared to own."

The album was ranked number 42 on Rolling Stones 50 Greatest Prog Rock Albums of All Time list. In 2017, Rolling Stone ranked Destroy Erase Improve as 77th on their list of 'The 100 Greatest Metal Albums of All Time.' The song Future Breed Machine appears in the shockumentary film Traces of Death IV.

Track listing

Personnel

Meshuggah
Jens Kidman – vocals
 Fredrik Thordendal – lead guitar, keyboards
 Mårten Hagström – rhythm guitar
 Tomas Haake – drums, voices
 Peter Nordin – bass

Production
 Daniel Bergstrand – mixing, engineering, production
 Fredrik Thordendal – mixing
 Meshuggah – production, cover design
 Peter In De Betou – mastering (at Cutting Room, Stockholm)
 Stefan Gillbald – cover artwork

Charts

References

1995 albums
Meshuggah albums
Nuclear Blast albums